Conus xicoi is a species of sea snail, a marine gastropod mollusk in the family Conidae, the cone snails and their allies.

Like all species within the genus Conus, these snails are predatory and venomous. They are capable of "stinging" humans, therefore live ones should be handled carefully or not at all.

Description
The size of the shell varies between 16 mm and 32 mm.

Distribution
This species occurs in the Atlantic Ocean off Angola.

References

 Röckel, D. 1987b. Conus xicoi, a new species from Angola (Prosobranchia: Conidae). Publicações Ocasionais da Sociedade Portuguesa de Malacologia 9: 44–48, 1 fig., 1 pl

External links
 The Conus Biodiversity website
 Cone Shells – Knights of the Sea
 

xicoi
Gastropods described in 1987